Freie Sachsen (Free Saxony) is a secessionist and autonomist movement within the German state of Saxony, which seeks to restore the former Saxon Royal Family and "Saexit if Necessary"  It views itself as a Right wing monarchist group.

History 
The inaugural meeting of "Free Saxony" in the Bermsgrün guest house was an occasion to question the use of the municipal building. The small party “Freie Sachsen”  played a key role in mobilizing for the protests against pandemic measures in Saxony. The organization seeks to extend its influence from the streets to town halls and possibly also to the state parliament. 

On February 26, 2021, Martin Kohlmann became chairman of the newly founded organization “Freie Sachsen” (not to be confused with the party Freie Sachsen – Alliance of Independent Voters, founded in 2007) in the Haus des Gastes in Bermsgrün, which describes itself as a party according to the party law. Contrarily, Freie Sachsen sees itself “in view of the state corona coercive measures” as an umbrella for a collection movement. Within a few months, the organization dominated discourse on Telegram, which had 150,000 subscribers as of February 2022, and to control the radical actions of the COVID-19 pandemic protesters in Saxony. Programmatically, they call for stronger cooperation with the Visegrád Group, with which they have views of security or family policy more in common than with West German federal states. The Free Saxons reject democracy and demand "to involve the Saxon royal family in shaping the future". 

The State Office for the Protection of the Constitution of Saxony classified the alliance as right-wing extremists in June 2021. Since January 2022, the Federal Office for the Protection of the Constitution has classified the Free Saxons as a suspected case and observed them nationwide. 

After the Russian invasion of Ukraine in February 2022, Putin masks were worn and Russian flags waved during the group's “walks”. The explanation of the Free Saxons: "Suddenly the unvaccinated is no longer the number one enemy!" Now "the Russians are the number one enemy".

Officials 

 Deputy chairmen: Stefan Hartung (NPD), city councilor in Aue-Bad Schlema and district councilor in the Erzgebirge district, and Plauen bus operator Thomas Kaden; 
 Treasurer: pro-Chemnitz functionary Robert Andres, who is a city councilor in Chemnitz.

See also 
Kingdom of Saxony
House of Wettin
Bavaria Party (EFA member)

South Schleswig Voters' Association (EFA member) and The Frisians

Lusatian Alliance

Protests against responses to the COVID-19 pandemic

European Free Alliance

List of active separatist movements in Europe

References

Saxony
Monarchist parties in Germany
Organisations based in Saxony
Right-wing politics
Far-right politics
Monarchist organizations